Josuah is a given name. Notable people with the name include:

Josuah Sylvester (1563–1618), English poet
Josuah Turner (1884–1960), English footballer

See also
Josiah (given name)

Masculine given names